Maoritenes modesta is a species of moth in the family Tortricidae first described by Alfred Philpott in 1930. This species is endemic to New Zealand.

References

Moths described in 1930
Schoenotenini
Endemic fauna of New Zealand
Taxa named by Alfred Philpott
Endemic moths of New Zealand